Pavlovsky is an urban locality (a work settlement) in Ochyorsky District of Perm Krai, Russia. Population:

Name
The settlement is commonly called simply Pavlovsk (even on the traffic signs ).

History
The factory that later became Pavlovsky Machinery Factory was founded in 1816 by Alexander Sergeyevich Stroganov. The settlement was named after his heir Pavel Alexandrovich. Since 1942, the factory's main products are turbodrills for oil extraction. The factory uses energy from a dam on Ochyor River, creating a picturesque reservoir called Pavlovsky Pond.

References

External links
Website of Pavlovsky Machinery Factory

Urban-type settlements in Perm Krai